Gyrineum perca is a species of predatory sea snail, a marine gastropod mollusk in the family Cymatiidae. It is more commonly known as the winged triton or the maple leaf triton.

Description
These unusual shells are quite flattened, well adapted to laying on a soft substrate, with large flanges close to the outer lips and a blade-like outpouching of the outer shell layer, forming two longitudinal folds (hence the genus name). Shell surface may be whitish, yellowish or pale brown.

Distribution
This species is widespread from the Eastern Africa to Japan.

References

 Hylleberg, J. & Kilburn., R. N. 2003. Marine molluscs of Vietnam. Annotations, voucher material, and species in need of verification Phuket Marine Biological Center Special Publication 28: 1-300

External links
 Good image from jaxshells at:

Bibliography
 Beu, A. (2010). Catalogue of Tonnoidea. Pers. comm.
 B. Wilson - Australian Marine Shells Part 1
 F Springsteen, F. M. Leobrera - Shells of the Philippines
 G. T. Poppe - Philippine Marine Molluscs Vol. 1
 Ngoc-Thach Nguyên - Shells of Vietnam
 Thomas Henning and Jens Hennens - Ranellidae and Personidae of the World
 Yoichiro Hirase - Shells of Japan

Cymatiidae
Gastropods described in 1811